Sheriffhall railway station served the village of Sheriffhall, Dalkeith, Scotland, from 1844 to 1849 on the Waverley Route.

History 
The station was opened in March 1844 by the Edinburgh and Dalkeith Railway. The station may have opened before, but information on the intermediate timetable was very vague. The station was situated between the A68 bridge and Sheriffhall. The station had a very short lifespan; it was only open for 5 years and it closed down once the North British Railway had taken over the line.

The site today 
The rebuilt section of the A6106 between Millerhill and Sheriffhall was opened on 30 March 2015, which means that a new railway, called the Borders Railway, can be opened parallel to the section of the road. The Borders Railway involves 30 miles of a new track with ten stops, 7 being new stations.

References

External links 

Disused railway stations in Midlothian
Railway stations in Great Britain opened in 1844
Railway stations in Great Britain closed in 1849
Former North British Railway stations
Dalkeith